Serine/threonine-protein kinase PAK 1 is an enzyme that in humans is encoded by the PAK1 gene.

PAK1 is one of six members of the PAK family of serine/threonine kinases which are broadly divided into group I (PAK1, PAK2 and PAK3) and group II (PAK4, PAK6 and PAK5/7). The PAKs are evolutionarily conserved. PAK1 localizes in distinct sub-cellular domains in the cytoplasm and nucleus. PAK1 regulates cytoskeleton remodeling, phenotypic signaling and gene expression, and affects a wide variety of cellular processes such as directional motility, invasion, metastasis, growth, cell cycle progression, angiogenesis. PAK1-signaling dependent cellular functions regulate both physiologic and disease processes, including cancer, as PAK1 is widely overexpressed and hyperstimulated in human cancer, at-large.

Discovery 
PAK1 was first discovered as an effector of the Rho GTPases in rat brain by Manser and colleagues in 1994. The human PAK1 was identified as a GTP-dependent interacting partner of Rac1 or Cdc42 in the cytosolic fraction from neutrophils, and its complementary DNA was cloned from a human placenta library by Martin and Colleagues in 1995.

Function 

PAK proteins are critical effectors that link the Rho family of GTPases (Rho GTPases) to cytoskeleton reorganization and nuclear signaling. PAK proteins, a family of serine/threonine p21-activated kinases, include PAK1, PAK2, PAK3 and PAK4. These proteins serve as targets for the small GTP binding proteins Cdc42 and Rac and have been implicated in a wide range of biological activities. PAK1 regulates cell motility and morphology. Alternative transcripts of this gene have been found, but their full-length natures have not been determined.

Stimulation of PAK1 activity is accompanied by a series of cellular processes that are fundamental to living systems. Being a nodular signaling molecule, PAK1 operates to converging station of a large number of signals triggered by proteins on the cell surface as well as upstream activators, and translates into specific phenotypes. At the biochemical level, these activities are regulated by the ability of PAK1 to phosphorylate its effector interacting substrates, which in-turn set-up a cascade of biochemical events cumulating into a cellular phenotypic response. In addition, PAK1 action is also influenced by its scaffolding activity. Examples of PAK1-regulated cellular processes include dynamic of actin and microtubule fibers, critical steps during cell cycle progression, motility and invasion, redox and energy metabolism, cell survival, angiogenesis, DNA-repair, hormone sensitivity, and gene expression. Functional implications of the PAK1 signaling are exemplified by its role in oncogenesis, viral pathogenesis, cardiovascular dysregulation, and neurological disorders.

Gene and spliced variants 
The human PAK1 gene is 153-kb long and consists of 23 exons, six exons for 5’-UTR and 17 exons for protein coding (Gene from review). Alternative splicing of six exons generates 20 transcripts from 308-bp to 3.7-kb long; however, only 12 spliced transcripts have open reading frames and are predicted to code ten proteins and two polypeptides. The remaining 8 transcripts range are for non-coding long RNAs from 308-bp to 863-bp long. Unlike the human PAK1, murine PAK1 gene generates five transcripts: three protein-coding from 508-bp to 3.0-kb long, and two transcripts of about 900-bp for non-coding RNAs.

Protein domains 

The core domains of the PAK family include a kinase domain in the C-terminal region, a p21-binding domain (PBD), and an auto-inhibitory domain (AID) in group I PAKs. Group I PAKs exist in an inactive, closed homodimer conformation wherein AID of one molecule binds to the kinase domain of another molecule, and activated in both GTPase-dependent and -independent manners.

Activation/inhibition 

PAK1 contains an autoinhibitory domain that suppresses the catalytic activity of its kinase domain. PAK1 activators relieve this autoinhibition and initiate conformational rearrangements and autophosphorylation events leading to kinase activation.

IPA-3 (1,1′-disulfanediyldinaphthalen-2-ol) is a small molecule allosteric inhibitor of PAK1. Preactivated PAK1 is resistant to IPA-3. Inhibition in live cells supports a critical role for PAK in PDGF-stimulated ERK activation. Reversible covalent binding of IPA-3 to the PAK1 regulatory domain prevents GTPase docking and the subsequent switch to a catalytically active state.

PAK1 knockdown in prostate cancer cells is associated with reduced motility, reduced MMP9 secretion and increased TGFβ expression, which in these cases, is growth inhibitory. However, IPA-3's pharmacokinetic properties as well as undesirable redox effects in cells, due to the continuous reduction of the sulfhydryl moiety, make it unsuitable for clinical development.

Upstream activators 

PAK1 activity is stimulated by a large number of upstream activators and signals, ranging from EGF, heregulin-beta 1, VEGF, basic fibroblast growth factor, platelet-derived growth factor, estrogen, lysophosphatidic acid, phosphoinositides, ETK, AKT, JAK2, ERK, casein kinase II, Rac3, chemokine (C-X-C motif) ligand 1, breast cancer anti-estrogen resistance 3, Kaposi's sarcoma-associated herpesvirus-G protein-coupled receptor, ARG-binding protein 2γ, hepatitis B virus X protein, STE20-related kinase adaptor protein α, RhoI, Klotho, N-acetylglucosaminyl transferase V, B-Raf proto-oncogene, casein kinase 2-interacting protein 1, and filamin A.

Downstream effector targets 

Functions of PAK1 are regulated by its ability to phosphorylate downstream effector substrates, scaffold activity, redistribution to distinct sub-cellular cellular sub-domains, stimulation or repression of expression of its genomic targets either directly or indirectly, or by all of these mechanisms. Representative PAK1 effector substrates in cancer cells include: Stathmin-S16, Merlin-S518, Vimentin-S25-S38-S50-S65-S72, Histone H3-S10, FilaminA-S2152, Estrogen receptor-alpha-S305, signal transducer and activator of transcription 5a-S779, C-terminal binding protein 1-S158, Raf1-S338, Arpc1b-T21, DLC1-S88, phosphoglucomutase 1-T466, SMART/HDAC1-associated repressor protein-S3486-T3568, Tubulin Cofactor B-S65-S128, Snail-S246  vascular endothelial-cadherin-S665, poly(RC) binding protein 1-T60-S246, integrin-linked kinase 1-T173-S246, epithelium-specific Ets transcription factor 1-S207, ErbB3 binding protein 1-T261, nuclear receptor-interacting factor 3-S28, SRC3-delta4-T56-S659-676, beta-catenin-S675, BAD-S111, BAD-S112, S136, MEK1-S298, CRKII-S41, MORC family CW-type zinc finger 2-S739, Paxillin-S258, and Paxillin-S273.

Genomic targets 

PAK1 and/or PAK1-dependent signals modulate the expression of  its genomic targets, including, vascular endothelial growth factor, Cyclin D1, phosphofructokinase-muscle isoform, nuclear factor of activated T-cell, Cyclin B1, Tissue Factor and tissue factor pathway inhibitor, Metalloproteinase 9, and fibronectin.

Interactions 

PAK1 has been shown to interact with:

 ARHGEF2, 
 ARPC1B, 
 BMX, 
 C-Raf, 
 CDC42,
 Cyclin-dependent kinase 5, 
 DYNLL1, 
 LIMK1, 
 NCK1, 
 PAK1IP1  and
 RAC1.

Notes

References

External links 
PAK1 Info with links in the Cell Migration Gateway